David Lonzo Thompson (May 21, 1969 – February 14, 2010) was an American electric blues guitarist, singer and songwriter, best known by his stage name Lil' Dave Thompson. He is best known for his tracks "She Didn't Say Goodbye" and "I Got the Blues".

Life and career
David Lonzo Thompson was born in Jackson, Mississippi, United States. His father, Sam Thompson, had played the blues with Asie Payton, Paul "Wine" Jones, and James "Son" Thomas amongst others. With his encouragement, Thompson learned to play blues guitar by the age of nine, and he formed his first group, the Delta Blues Band, in Leland, Mississippi in his early teens. He teamed up with Booba Barnes in 1984, and played the Mississippi juke joint circuit.

He first recorded on I Got the Dog in Me (1994), a Fat Possum Records release, providing guitar backing for David Malone, one of Junior Kimbrough's sons. Thompson's own debut record was Little Dave and Big Love (1995). It was also released by Fat Possum. Little Dave and Big Love was produced by Robert Palmer, and nominated for two W. C. Handy Awards in 1996 for 'Best New Blues Artist' and 'Contemporary Blues Album'.

In 2002, Thompson released C'mon Down to the Delta on JSP Records. In 2006, Got to Get Over You appeared, issued by Electro-Fi Records, whilst Deep in the Night followed in 2008. Regarding the latter, Down Beat magazine stated it was "Incendiary and feral, with a church choir hustle and a Mississippi hill country stomp".  Constant touring gave Thompson a growing loyal audience.

In 2012, C'mon Down to the Delta was re-released.

Death
On February 14, 2010, and following the last gig of their tour at Fiery Ron's Home Team BBQ in Sullivan's Island, South Carolina, his entourage were driving back to Greenville, Mississippi, when his band's touring Ford van overturned on Interstate 20 in Aiken County, South Carolina. Thompson was thrown from the passenger seat and pronounced dead on arrival. He was aged 40. Thompson was buried in Indianola, Mississippi.

Discography

See also
List of electric blues musicians

References

1969 births
2010 deaths
American blues singers
20th-century African-American male singers
American male singers
American blues guitarists
American male guitarists
Electric blues musicians
Blues musicians from Mississippi
Songwriters from Mississippi
Musicians from Jackson, Mississippi
Road incident deaths in South Carolina
Fat Possum Records artists
Guitarists from Mississippi
People from Leland, Mississippi
20th-century American guitarists
20th-century American male musicians
JSP Records artists
African-American songwriters
African-American guitarists
21st-century African-American people
American male songwriters